Nationality words link to articles with information on the nation's poetry or literature (for instance, Irish or France).

Events

Works published
 Sarah Fyge Egerton (later Sarah Field), The Female Advocate, published anonymously in reply to Robert Gould's Love Given O're 1682
 Thomas Flatman, A Song for St Caecilia's Day
 Anne Killigrew, Poems by Mrs Anne Killigrew
 Susanna Elizabeth Zeidler, Jungferlicher Zeitvertreiber (Pastime for Virgins)
 Matsuo Bashō publishes one of his best-remembered haiku:

furu ike ya / kawazu tobikomu / mizu no oto
an ancient pond / a frog jumps in / the splash of water [1686]

Births
Death years link to the corresponding "[year] in poetry" article:
 Allan Ramsay (died 1758), Scottish poet
 Andrew Michael Ramsay (died 1743), Scottish-born writer and poet who lived most of his adult life in France

Deaths
Birth years link to the corresponding "[year] in poetry" article:
 Shimonokōbe Chōryū (born 1624), Japanese poet-scholar

See also

 Poetry
 17th century in poetry
 17th century in literature
 Restoration literature

Notes

17th-century poetry
Poetry